The leerfish or garrick (Lichia amia) is a species of marine fish in the family Carangidae, and is native to the Mediterranean and the coastal waters of western Africa to the coastal waters of eastern South Africa. Also recorded in the Black Sea. These fish can reach 1.5 m in length and more than 30 kg  in weight. They inhabit the coastal wave zone where they form small shoals to hunt other smaller fish, favouring mullets.

References

Trachinotinae
Fauna of Portugal
Fish of South Africa
Fish of the Mediterranean Sea
Marine fauna of West Africa
Marine fauna of Southern Africa
Fish described in 1758
Taxa named by Carl Linnaeus